Kathlyn Margaret Mary Ragg (born 21 October 1962) is a Fijian former cyclist. She competed in the women's road race event at the 1984 Summer Olympics.

References

External links
 

1962 births
Living people
Fijian female cyclists
Olympic cyclists of Fiji
Cyclists at the 1984 Summer Olympics
Place of birth missing (living people)